African countries do not use daylight saving time (DST), although some did in the past. Only the territories of the Canary Islands, Ceuta and Melilla (Spain) and Madeira (Portugal) implement DST from the last Sunday in March to the last Sunday in October. Although these regions politically belong to Europe, they are geographically part of Africa. They have DST schedules according to European Union rules.

African countries that used to use DST

Egypt

The British first instituted daylight saving time in Egypt during the Second World War, specifically between 1940 and 1945. The practice was stopped after the war, but resumed 12 years later, in 1957.

Egypt normally observed daylight saving time between the last Friday in April and the last Thursday in September when the clocks were three hours ahead of Greenwich Mean Time (UTC+3). The change occurred one second after 23:59:59 on Thursday to become 1:00:00 on the last Friday in April shortening the day to 23 hours. Summer time ended one second after 23:59:59 to become 23:00:00 on the last Thursday of September lengthening the day to 25 hours. The date did not change one second after the first 23:59:59 occurred; for all practical purposes, midnight did not occur until after the second 23:59:59. An exception was made for Ramadan; in 2006 the end of DST took place one week earlier, on 21 September 2006, which took place before the start of the holy month of Ramadan. The same practice recurred in 2007 and 2008, to avoid having longer days in Ramadan. In 2009, summer time ended on Thursday, 20 August, five weeks before the nominal end on the last Thursday in September. In 2010, the summer time started on 30 April and ended on 30 September, but between 10 August and 10 September summer time was cancelled because of Ramadan. The previous government was planning to take a decision to abolish it in 2011 before the January 25 Revolution. The transitional government abolished daylight saving time on 20 April 2011. On May 7, 2014, the Egyptian government restored daylight saving time starting on 16 May with an exception for the holy month of Ramadan.

From 2015 onwards, Egypt no longer observes it. On April 29, 2016, the Egyptian government made plans to restore daylight saving time starting on July 7th, 2016 during Eid al-Fitr, however later on July 4, 2016, the Egyptian government cancelled these plans to re-introduce DST.

Libya

Libya observed DST each year from 1982 to 1989, 1997, and 2013.

Morocco

, daylight saving time (DST) is no longer observed in Morocco, advancing to UTC+01:00 permanently since 2019.

Namibia

At Independence of Namibia the country inherited the time regulations of South Africa and was in time zone UTC+02:00 all year round. Triggered by fears for school children walking to school before sunrise,  Namibian Standard Time, a type of winter time, was introduced in 1993.

From 1994 until 2017 Namibia used Winter time, the practice of setting clocks back during winter months by one hour. In this period Namibian Standard Time was at UTC+02:00 Central Africa Time in summer, and UTC+01:00 (West Africa Time) in winter. Winter time began on the first Sunday in April at 03:00, and lasted until the first Sunday in September, 02:00 hours. In the Zambezi Region in the far north-east of Namibia clocks were not changed and remained on Central Africa Time all year round so that during winter time, Namibia spanned two time zones.

In the 2010s repeated calls from businesses and private individuals were made to abolish winter time, citing incompatibilities with South Africa, Namibia's main trading partner, as well as a "loss of productivity". The National Council passed the Namibian Time Bill 2017 in August 2017 and repealed the 1993 act, placing Namibia back into the South African Standard Time zone of UTC+02:00.

Tunisia

Tunisia adopted daylight saving time for the first time in 2005 starting 1 May 2005 and following EU time schedules thereafter. This comes as a move by the government to promote saving of energy. In 2009 the government of Tunisia canceled DST and kept the standard time all year round.

African countries not using DST

These countries or regions do not use daylight saving time, although some have in the past:

 (Observed DST in 2002–2004)

 (Observed DST in 1968–1991; 2003–2009; 2013–2016)

 (Observed DST in 2011–2014)

 (Observed DST in 1999–2015)

 (Observed DST in 1942-1944)

References

Daylight saving time
Geography of Africa